The Copa Ibérica de Rugby (Iberian Rugby Cup) is a rugby union knock-out competition played annually by clubs of the Spanish Rugby Federation and Portuguese Rugby Federation. It was played for the first time in 1965.

Between 1965 and 1971 it was played by 4 clubs (2 of each country, both Champion's and both Runner's-up), that face each other in ligule type competition. The competition stopped being played in 1972, but returned in 1983 with a new format, with the 2 Champion's facing each other in just one game. In the season 2007–2008 it returned to the ligule type competition.

In 2009, a new competition named Iberian Rugby Cup was designed. This style of rugby was meant to be played with 8 teams, four of each federation, although it was suspended.

On 6 January 2013, CDUL defeated Quesos Entrepinares by 24–13, winning their 3rd title, in the return of the Copa Ibérica after a 5-year gap.

Winners by year

Performance by club

Titles by country

References

External links
 Federação Portuguesa Rugby site
 Palmarés in FER

See also
 Rugby union in Portugal
 Rugby union in Spain

Rugby union competitions in Portugal
Spanish rugby union competitions
1965 establishments in Spain
1965 establishments in Portugal